Established on June 18, 1904, Chicago’s Pekin Theatre was the first black owned musical and vaudeville stock theatre in the United States.  Between 1904 and around 1915, the Pekin Club and  its Pekin Theatre served as a training ground and showcase for Black theatrical talent, vaudeville acts, and musical comedies.  Additionally, the theatre allowed “African-American theatre artists with an opportunity to master theater craft and contribute significantly to the development of an emerging Black theater tradition”.

The Pekin became "renowned for its all-black stock company and school for actors, an orchestra able to play ragtime and opera with equal brilliance, and a repertoire of original musical comedies." Robert T Motts, founded the theatre, and brought it to prominence by presenting an all black company, seeking out an affluent interracial audience, and using his establishment for social causes.  Mott died in 1911, and after that the theater faded but he had established a new pattern of successful black enterprise.

History 
Following a 1901 trip to the Parisian music hall, “Cafe Chantants”, Robert T. Motts, a Chicago saloon keeper and gambling king was inspired to “make a contribution to his race by providing entertainment along more cultural and uplifting lines”. In 1904, he converted his Pekin saloon and restaurant, located at the corner of 27th and State Street, into the Pekin Theatre “Temple of Music”.  Following a fire in 1906, Motts renovated the entire building, increasing the capacity from 400 to 1200, including box and lodge seating.  With its own “stock company of colored artists, original musical comedies, farces, and plays written and composed by colored men", the ‘New Pekin Theatre’ re-opened on March 31, 1906 with the first production of the musical The Man from 'Bam.  Hiring a collection of "talented and experienced group of theatre operatives"  including Charles Sager as stage manager, J. Ed. Green as producing director, and Joe Jordan as the resident director of music, Motts' Pekin Theatre became the "only theatre in America playing colored artists exclusively", at a time when “most whites believed that Blacks possessed little or no skill in theater management”.

In all the Pekin Theatre’s all African-American staff of 18 included a press agent, a treasurer, and a house physician, as well as its acting troupe, the Pekin Stock Co., with 34 members.  Among the numerous actors, playwrights, and directors to have contributed to the Pekin’s enormous popularity were Charles Sidney Gilpin, Jesse A. Shipp, Harrison Stewart (1882-1918), Lottie Grady, and J.Ed Green.  Despite a decline in the overall interest in vaudeville and stock theatre, and a rise in the competition from White-owned theaters in Bronzeville, Chicago, the Pekin continued thrive under Motts' ownership until his passing in 1911.  According to J. Hockley Smiley of the Chicago Defender "no other funeral in the memory of the writer has brought out such a vast crowd of people as that of Mr. Motts".  Following his passing, the Pekin remained in the Motts' estate before being sold to various owners over the next decade, never fully reclaiming its prominent position.

By 1910, there were over 53 Black-owned and operated Theatres across the United States, including seven theatres named after Robert T. Motts' New Pekin Theatre.

See also
African Grove Theatre an African American owned live company specializing in drama that existed in 1820s New York City.

References

Further reading 
 

African-American history of Illinois
Theatres in Chicago
1905 establishments in Illinois